Børresen is a surname. Notable people with the surname include:

Arne Børresen (1907–1947), Norwegian footballer
Børge Børresen (1919–2007), Danish sailor
Erik Børresen (1785–1860), Norwegian ship owner, merchant and philanthropist
Geir Børresen (born 1942), Norwegian actor and entertainer
Hakon Børresen (1876–1954), Danish composer
Hans Peter Børresen (1825–1901), Danish missionary 
Ida Børresen (born 1950), Norwegian civil servant
Nils Elias Børresen (1812–1863), Norwegian politician
Odd Børresen (1923–2010), Norwegian linguist, preacher, and missionary
Ole Børresen, Danish sailor
Urban Jacob Rasmus Børresen (1857–1943), Norwegian rear admiral and industry leader

Danish-language surnames
Norwegian-language surnames